The Tour du Jura is a one-day cycling race held annually in Switzerland. It is part of UCI Europe Tour in category 1.2.

Winners

References

Cycle races in Switzerland
UCI Europe Tour races
Recurring sporting events established in 1981
1981 establishments in Switzerland